The Báb (b. ʿAlí Muḥammad; 20 October 1819 – 9 July 1850), was the messianic founder of Bábism, and one of the central figures of the Baháʼí Faith. He was a merchant from Shiraz in Qajar Iran who, in 1844 at the age of 25, claimed to be a messenger of God. He took the title Báb (meaning "Gate" or "Door"), a reference to the deputy of the Hidden Imam, while instigating a religious revolution that proposed the abrogation of Islamic laws and traditions, and the establishment of a new religion. Though he was popular among the lower classes, he faced opposition from the orthodox clergy and government, which eventually executed him and thousands of his followers, known as Bábís.

The Báb composed numerous letters and books in which he introduced the ideas of a new social order and a promise that a new divine messenger was coming soon. He encouraged learning arts and sciences, gave prescriptions to regulate marriage, divorce, and inheritance, and set never-implemented rules for a future Bábí society. Though several upheavals saw clashes between the government and Bábís defending themselves, the Báb taught his followers to be peaceful and not convert by the sword.

When the Báb was executed for apostasy, he was tied up in a public square in Tabriz and faced a firing squad of 750 rifles. When the smoke cleared, with around ten thousand watching, the Báb had disappeared, only to be returned and shot a second time. This widely documented phenomenon aroused even more interest in his message. His remains were secretly stored and transported until they were interred in 1909 into the shrine built for them by ʻAbdu'l-Bahá on the slopes of Mount Carmel.

To Baháʼís, the Báb fills a similar role as Elijah in Judaism or John the Baptist in Christianity: a forerunner or founder of their own religion. Adherence to the Báb as a divine messenger has survived into modern times in the form of the 5-8 million member Baháʼí Faith, whose founder, Baháʼu'lláh, claimed in 1863 to be the fulfillment of the Báb's prophecy. The majority of Bábí adherents converted and became Baháʼís by the end of the 19th century.

Background

Early life

Siyyid ʿAlí Muḥammad Shírází was born on 20 October 1819 (1 Muharram 1235 AH), in Shiraz to a middle-class merchant of the city and given the name ʿAlí Muḥammad. He was a descendant of Muhammad, a Sayyid, with both parents tracing their lineage through Husayn ibn Ali. His father was Muhammad Riḍá, and his mother was Fátimih (1800–1881), a daughter of a prominent Shiraz merchant. She later became a Baháʼí. His father died when he was quite young, and his maternal uncle Hájí Mírzá Siyyid ʿAlí, a merchant, reared him. 

In Shiraz his uncle sent him to a maktab primary school, where he remained for six or seven years. In contrast to the formal, orthodox theology which dominated the school curriculum of the time, which included the study of jurisprudence and Arabic grammar, the Bab from a young age felt inclined towards unconventional subjects like mathematics and calligraphy, which were little studied. The Bab's preoccupation with spirituality, creativity and imagination also angered his teachers and was not tolerated in the atmosphere of the 19th century Persian school system. This led the Bab to become disillusioned with the education system, he later instructs adults to treat children with dignity, to allow children to have toys and engage in play and to never show anger or harshness to their students.

Sometime between age 15 and 20 he joined his uncle in the family business, a trading house, and became a merchant in the city of Bushehr, Iran, near the Persian Gulf. As a merchant, he was renowned for his honesty and trustworthiness in his business, which was focused on trade with India, Oman, and Bahrain. Some of his earlier writings suggest that he did not enjoy the business and instead applied himself to the study of religious literature.

Marriage
In 1842, at age 23 and following his mother's wishes, he married 20 year old Khadíjih-Sultán Bagum (1822–1882), the daughter of a prominent merchant in Shíráz. The marriage proved a happy one, though their only child — a boy named Ahmad — died the year he was born (1843) and Khadijih never conceived again. The young couple occupied a modest house in Shiraz along with the Báb's mother. Later, Khadijih became a Baháʼí.

Shaykhi movement
In the 1790s in Iraq, Shaykh Ahmad (1753–1826) began a religious school of thought within Shia Islam. His followers, who became known as Shaykhis, were expecting the imminent return of divine guidance through the appearance of the Mahdi, the Hidden Imam, or a deputy of the Hidden Imam. He took a less-literalist approach to Islamic teachings, for example teaching that the material body of Muhammad did not ascend during the Mi'raj, and that the expected Resurrection of the Dead was spiritual in nature. Shaykh Ahmad came into conflict with the orthodox Shia theologians of the time and was denounced as an infidel in 1824.

After Shaykh Ahmad's death, leadership passed to Kazim Rashti (1793–1843), and emphasis was placed on the year 1260 AH (1844 CE), one thousand years lunar years after the twelfth Imam went into occultation. In 1841 the Báb went on pilgrimage to Iraq, and stayed for seven months mostly in and around Karbala, where he attended lectures of Kazim Rashti. As of his death in December 1843, Kazim Rashti counselled his followers to leave their homes to seek the Mahdi, who, according to his prophecies, would soon appear. One of these followers, Mullá Husayn, after keeping vigil for 40 days in a mosque, travelled to Shiraz, where he met the Báb.

Personality and appearance
Sources commonly describe the Báb as gentle, precocious, or gifted with great intelligence. One of his contemporary followers described him as,
 

An Irish physician described him as "a very mild and delicate-looking man, rather small in stature and very fair for a Persian, with a melodious soft voice, which struck me much". Shoghi Effendi notes "the gentle, the youthful and irresistible person of the Báb" and praises him as being "matchless in His meekness, imperturbable in His serenity, magnetic in His utterance" This personality has been described as having "captivated many of those who met him".

Life as a religious leader
The Báb's mission as a religious leader began with a dream in which he drank seven drops of blood dripping from the lacerated throat of Imam Husayn — a significant martyr and symbol of sacrifice in Shia Islam. Although previously inclined toward sharing the Qur'an, it was after this dream that he was able to write his own verses and prayers, claiming divine inspiration. In April, 1844, his wife Khadijih became the first to believe in his revelation.

Declaration to Mullá Husayn

The Báb's first religiously inspired experience, claimed and witnessed by his wife, is dated to about the evening of 3 April 1844. The Báb's first public connection with his sense of a mission came with the arrival of Mullá Husayn in Shiraz. On the night of 22 May Mullá Husayn was invited by the Báb to his home where Mullá Husayn told him of his search for the possible successor to Kazim Rashti, the Promised One. The Báb claimed this, and to be the bearer of divine knowledge. Mullá Husayn became the first to accept the Báb's claims to be an inspired figure and a likely successor to Kazim Rashti. The Báb had replied satisfactorily to all of Mullá Husayn's questions and had written in his presence, with extreme rapidity, a long tafsir, commentary, on surah "Yusuf", known as the Qayyúmu'l-Asmáʼ and considered the Báb's first revealed work. It has been adopted as a Baháʼí Holy Day.

Letters of the Living
Mullá Husayn became the Báb's first disciple. Within five months, seventeen other disciples of Kazim Rashti recognized the Báb as a Manifestation of God. Among them was a woman, Fátimih Zarrín Táj Barag͟háni, a poetess, who later received the name of Táhirih, the Pure. These 18 disciples later became known as the Letters of the Living (each soul containing one letter of the Spirit of God, which combine to form the Word) and given the task of spreading the new faith (understood as the return or continuation of the one Faith of Abraham) across Iran and Iraq. The Báb emphasized the spiritual station of these 18 individuals, who, along with himself, made the first "Unity" of his religion according to the Arabic term wāḥid, unity, that has a numerical value of 19 using abjad numerals. The Báb's book, the Persian Bayán, gives the metaphorical identity of the Letters of the Living as the Fourteen Infallibles of Twelver Shiʿi Islam: Muhammad, the Twelve Imams, and Fatimah, and the four archangels, paralleling the first followers of Christ.

Travels and imprisonment
After the eighteen Letters of the Living recognized him, the Báb and Quddús left on a pilgrimage to Mecca and Medina, the sacred cities of Islam. At the Kaaba in Mecca, the Báb publicly claimed to be the Qa'im, and wrote to the Sharif of Mecca, the Custodian of the Kaaba, proclaiming his mission. After their pilgrimage, the Báb and Quddús returned to Bushehr, where they last saw each other. Quddús' travel to Shiraz brought the Báb's claim to the attention of the governor, Husayn Khan, who tortured Quddús and summoned the Báb to Shiraz in June 1845. The Imam-Jum'ih of Shiraz questioned Báb about his claims. He denied that he was the representative of the Qá'im or an intermediary to the faithful; the Báb later repeated the same in front of a congregation at the Vakil Mosque. This renunciation saved him from immediate execution. Abbas Amanat states, "in conformity with his own policy of prudence" during the early stages of his mission, the Báb wrote a statement, apparently under pressure, recanting his claims to the position of Babiya (gatehood). He disowned those who advocated such beliefs about him in these words: "If certain words flowed from my pen, they are purely instinctive and entirely against the accepted norms and thus not to be taken as proofs of any cause."

The Báb was placed under house arrest at the home of his uncle until a cholera epidemic broke out in the city in September 1846. Once released he departed for Isfahan. There, many came to see him at the house of the Imam-Jum'ih, who became sympathetic. After an informal gathering where the Báb debated the local clergy and displayed his speed in producing instantaneous verses, his popularity soared. After the death of the governor of Isfahan, Manouchehr Khan Gorji, his supporter, pressure from the clergy of the province led to Mohammad Shah Qajar ordering the Báb to Tehran in January 1847. After spending several months in a camp outside Tehran, and before the Báb could meet the Shah, the Prime Minister sent the Báb to Tabriz in the northwestern corner of the country, to his confinement.

After 40 days in Tabriz, the Báb transferred to the fortress of Maku, Iran in the province of Azerbaijan near the Turkish border. During his incarceration there, the Báb began his most important work, the Persian Bayán, that remained unfinished. Because of the Báb's growing popularity in Maku, even the governor of Maku converting, the prime minister transferred him to the fortress of Chihríq in April 1848. There too the Báb's popularity grew and his jailors relaxed restrictions on him.

Trial in Tabríz
In June 1848, the Báb was brought from Chihríq to Tabríz to face trial for apostasy in front of a body of Islamic clergy. On the way, he spent 10 days in the town of Urmia, where the only known portrait of him was made, a copy of which was later sent to Baháʼu'lláh and is still held in the International Archives at the Baháʼí World Centre.

The trial, attended by the Crown Prince, occurred in July 1848 and involved numerous local clergy. They questioned the Báb about the nature of his claims, his teachings, and demanded that he produce miracles to prove his divine authority. They admonished him to recant his claims. There are nine extant eyewitness reports of the trial, of which several may originate from an earlier source. Six of the reports are from Muslim accounts, and portray the Báb in an unfavorable light. There are 62 questions found in the nine sources, however eighteen occur in one source, fifteen in two, eight in three, five in four, thirteen in five, and three in six. Not including "yes" and "he did not answer", only thirty-five answers remain, of which ten occur in one source, eight in two, six in three, three in four, two in five, five in six. Only one answer is found in all nine eyewitness sources, where the Báb states that "I am that person you have been awaiting for one thousand years."

The trial did not bring a decisive result. Some clergy called for capital punishment, but the government pressured them to issue a lenient judgement because the Báb was popular. The government asked medical experts to declare the Báb insane to prevent his execution. It is also likely that the government as a face-saving measure and to appease the religious clergy may have spread rumours that the Báb recanted.

The Shaykh al-Islām, a champion of the anti-Bábist campaign, not at the Báb's trial, issued a conditional death sentence if the Báb was found to be sane. A fatwa was issued establishing the Báb's apostasy and stated "The repentance of an incorrigible apostate is not accepted, and the only thing which has caused the postponement of thy execution is a doubt as to thy sanity of mind."

The crown prince's physician, William Cormick, examined the Báb and complied with the government's request to find grounds for clemency. The physician's opinion saved the Báb from execution for a time, but the clergy insisted that he face corporal punishment instead, so the Báb suffered foot whipping – 20 lashes to the bottoms of his feet.

The unsigned and undated official government report states that because of his harsh beating, the Báb orally and in writing recanted, apologized, and stated that he would not continue to advance claims of divinity. The document of his alleged recantation was written shortly after his trial in Tabriz. Some authors theorise that the assertions were made to embarrass the Báb and undermine his credibility with the public, and that the language of this document is very different from the Báb's usual style, and so prepared by the authorities.

A facsimile of the recantation is published in Browne's Materials for the Study of the Babi Religion, where he states, "[The document], unsigned and undated, was claimed to be in the Báb's handwriting and consists of a complete recantation and renunciation of any superhuman claim which he may have advanced or have appeared to advance. There is nothing to show to whom it is addressed, or whether it is the recantation referred to in the last paragraph of the [government report] or another. The handwriting, though graceful, is not easily legible..." But Amanat considers the document, which has no signature and date, to be fabricated. According to Amanat the document does not match the writing style of the Báb and was forged by the government officials of Tabriz to discredit  him and please the Shah. Amanat believes that in the best scenario, the document may have been prepared by the government officials, but the Báb refused to sign it. He stood his ground despite great pressure to recant, and gain his freedom. Consequently he was executed by a firing squad in public in Tabriz to crush the Babi movement and to display the restored power of the Qajar government under the new minister, Amir Kabir. 

After the trial, the Báb was ordered back to the fortress of Chehríq.

Proclamation

In his early writings (1844-1847), the Báb appears to identify himself as a gate (báb), a reference to the Four Deputies of the Hidden Imam, the last of which went into occultation in 941 CE. In his later writings, the Báb more explicitly proclaimed his station as that of the Hidden Imam and a new messenger from God. 

The nature of the Báb's different claims and how they were understood to various groups is complicated. Detractors argue that the changing claims represent the Báb's own changing aspirations, while supporters describe the issue as a prudent and gradual disclosure of a coherent identity. For example, the Báb's first writing was designed in the same style as the Qur'an, something that would have been easily recognized at the time as a claim to revelation. Saiedi writes, 

According to Manuchehri, the approach of laying claim to a lower position was intended to create a sense of anticipation for the appearance of the Hidden Imam, as well to avoid persecution and imprisonment, because a public proclamation of mahdi status could bring a swift penalty of death. In the early months of his public declarations, the adoption of a cautious policy had essentially achieved maximum attention with minimum controversy. 

The gradual unfolding of claims caused some confusion, both among the public and for some of his followers. Some early believers saw him as a messenger from God with divine authority, and this resulted in disagreement within the Bábi community. Even though the Báb had intended to convey his message with discretion, many of his followers such as Táhirih openly declared the coming of the promised Hidden Imam and Mahdi.

Execution

In mid-1850 a new prime minister, Amir Kabir, ordered the execution of the Báb, probably because of various Bábí insurrections' defeats and because the movement's popularity appeared to be waning. The Báb was brought back to Tabriz from Chehriq for an execution by firing squad. The night before his execution, while being conducted to his cell, a young Bábí, Muhammad-Ali (Anis) from Zonuz, begged for martyrdom with him, then was immediately arrested and placed in the same cell as the Báb.

On the morning of 9 July 1850 (28 Sha'ban 1266 AH), the Báb was taken to the courtyard of the barracks where he was imprisoned. Thousands of people gathered to watch his execution. The Báb and Anis were suspended on a wall and a large firing squad of soldiers prepared to shoot. Numerous eye-witness reports, including those of Western diplomats, recount the result. The order was given to fire. Accounts differ on the details, but all agree that the first volley failed to kill the Báb; the bullets had instead cut the rope suspending them from the wall. A second firing squad was brought in and a second order to fire given. This time the Báb was killed. In Bábí and Baháʼí tradition, the failure of the first volley to kill the Báb is believed to be a miracle. The remains of the Báb and Anis were thrown into a ditch and assumed eaten by dogs, an action condemned by Justin Sheil, then British Minister in Tehran.

The remains were clandestinely rescued by a handful of Bábis and then hidden. Over time the remains were secretly transported according to the instructions of Baháʼu'lláh and then ʿAbdu'l-Bahá by way of Isfahan, Kirmanshah, Baghdad, Damascus, Beirut, and then by sea to Acre on the plain below Mount Carmel in 1899. On 21 March 1909, the remains were interred in a special tomb, the Shrine of the Báb, erected for this purpose by ʻAbdu'l-Bahá, on Mount Carmel in present-day Haifa, Israel. In its vicinity, the Baháʼí World Centre welcomes visitors to tour the gardens.

Teachings and legacy

The Báb's ideas had roots in Shaykhism and his writings were characterized by their extensive use of symbolism and numerical calculations. 

The Báb's teachings have three broad stages, each with a dominant thematic focus. His earliest teachings are primarily defined by his interpretation of the Quran and hadith, and that his teachings are in alignment with "true Islam". Rather than revealing new religious laws, early Babi doctrine "focuses on the inner and mystical meanings of religious law" and "turning ritual action into a spiritual journey" These themes continue in later years, but a shift takes place where his emphasis moves to philosophical elucidation, and finally to legislative pronouncements. 

In the second philosophical stage, the Báb gives an explanation of the metaphysics of being and creation, and in the third legislative stage his mystical and historical principles unite as the Báb's writings gain a historical consciousness. and clearly establish the principle of Progressive Revelation.

The Bab discusses many fundamental issues in religion in this second stage including how to recognize spiritual truth, the nature of the human being, the meaning of faith, the nature of good deeds, the preconditions of spiritual journey and the question of the eternality or origination of the world. He even, in his Treatise on Singing, explores the philosophy of music.

In 1848 the Báb's teachings changed with a clear abrogation of Islamic law and the introduction of his own set of doctrines. The Báb's legal system included details for marriage, burial, pilgrimage, prayer, and other practices that appear designed for a future Bábí state or to be implemented by He whom God shall make manifest, a future prophet who is mentioned throughout the Báb's writings. 

In many respects, the Báb raised the status of women in his teachings. He taught that since God transcends the boundaries of male and female, God wishes that "neither men exalt themselves over women, nor women exalt themselves over men". The Báb instructed his followers to not mistreat women "even for the blink of an eye" and set the penalty for causing grief to women as double that of causing grief to men. He also encouraged the education of women and didn't display a gender distinction in Bábi laws on education. Armin Eschraghi notes the context of 19th century Iran and that, "Modern western readers might not appreciate the revolutionary potential" of the Báb's teaching that "Those who have been brought up in this community, men and women, are allowed to look [at each other], speak and sit together" The Primal Will of God is also personified as the female figure of the maid of heaven. The Báb also foreshadowed later developments in media, by emphasising the need for a rapid system of news communication, which would be available for all to access, no matter their wealth or social standing. He writes, regarding the news, that "until such a system is made universal, its benefit will not reach those servants of the kingdom unless there come a time when it will be accessible to all the people. Although today the kings have their own special couriers, this is fruitless, for the poor are deprived of such a service."

Jack McLean, summarizing Nader Saiedi's analysis, writes that the Báb's writings "foresee current global issues of crisis, such as the protection of the environment and the commodification of natural resources" The Báb specifically calls for the absolute purity of water in the Bayán and as all substances return to the inland water table and the oceans, this could easily be seen as a general law for the protection of the environment. The Arabic Bayán also forbids the commodification of the four elements, earth, air, fire and water.

The Báb's theological teachings include, "gnostic and Neoplatonist features common to earlier Shiʿite sects such as the Ismaʿilis and Ḥorūfīs" and, "at the heart of the system is the belief that the divine or eternal essence is unknowable, indescribable, and inaccessible", according to Denis MacEoin. This would continue as a key principle of the Baha'i Faith. (see God in the Baháʼí Faith) 

The Báb also developed a distinct philosophy of aesthetics, which emphasised beauty and refinement (litafat) as governing principles, not only for art but for our actions, and stressed the need to bring all things to their highest state of perfection, or paradise (itqan). Saiedi writes that, "The Bab makes it clear that He wants His community to be the embodiment of perfection in all things. Furthermore, He defines beautification and excellence in art as the means of the spiritualization of the world". The Báb himself writes, using calligraphy as an example of a universal principle, "Should he know of a higher degree of refinement and fail to manifest it upon that paper, he would deprive it of its paradise, and he would be held accountable, for why hast thou, despite the possession of the means, withheld the effusion of grace and favour?"

Succession

In most of his prominent writings, the Báb alluded to a Promised One, most commonly referred to as man yazhiruhu'lláh, "Him Whom God shall make manifest", and that he himself was "but a ring upon the hand of Him Whom God shall make manifest". Within 20 years of the Báb's death, over 25 people claimed to be the Promised One, most significantly Baháʼu'lláh.

Before the Báb's death, he sent a letter to Mírzá Yahyá, Subh-i-Azal, that some consider a will and testament. This recognized the appointing of Subh-i-Azal as the leader of the Bábí community after the death of the Báb, and ordered to obey the Promised One when he appears. At the time Subh-i-Azal, still a teenager, had never demonstrated leadership in the Bábí movement, and was still living in the house of his older brother, Baháʼu'lláh. The Baháʼí claim that the Báb appointed Subh-i-Azal the head of the Bábí Faith so as to divert attention away from Baháʼu'lláh, while allowing Bábís to visit Baháʼu'lláh and consult with him freely, and allowing Baháʼu'lláh to write to Bábís easily and freely. The danger that threatened Bahá'u'lláh was from Amir Kabir. According to Saiedi, if Amir Kabir knew about the key role that Bahá'u'lláh was playing in the Bábí community, he would have him executed.

In 1852 Baháʼu'lláh, while a prisoner in Tehran, was visited by a "Maid of Heaven", that symbolically marked the beginning of his mission as a Messenger of God. Eleven years later in Baghdad, he made his first public declaration and eventually was recognized by the vast majority of Bábís as "He Whom God shall make manifest". His followers began calling themselves Baháʼís.

Subh-i-Azal's followers became known as Azalis or Azali Bábís. For the Bábís who did not recognize Baháʼu'lláh, Subh-i-Azal remained their leader until his death in 1912, and Azali successorship remains disputed. Baháʼí sources report that 11 of the 18 "witnesses" appointed by Subh-i-Azal to oversee the Bábí community became Baháʼís, as his son did. The man allegedly appointed by Subh-i-Azal to succeed him, Hadíy-i-Dawlat-Abádí, later publicly recanted his faith in the Báb and Subh-i-Azal.

Baháʼu'llah emerged more successful and nearly all of the Báb's followers abandoned Subh-i-Azal and became Baháʼís. Today Baháʼís have several million followers, while estimates of the number of Azalís are generally around one thousand in Iran, and any organization of theirs seems to have ceased to exist.

Commemorations in the Baháʼí Faith

In the Baháʼí calendar the events of the birth, declaration and death of the Báb are commemorated by Baháʼí communities on a yearly basis. At the centennial of the declaration of the Báb to Mulla Husayn in May 1944, the Baháʼís had a viewing of the portrait of the Báb during the celebrations held at the Baháʼí House of Worship (Wilmette, Illinois). Speaking at the event were Dorothy Beecher Baker, Horace Holley, and others.

The notion of "twin Manifestations of God" is a concept fundamental to Baháʼí belief, describing the relationship between the Báb and Baháʼu'lláh. Both are considered Manifestations of God in their own right, having each founded separate religions (Bábism and the Baháʼí Faith) and revealed their own holy scriptures. To Baháʼís, however, the missions of the Báb and Baháʼu'lláh are inextricably linked: The Báb's mission was to prepare the way for the coming of Him whom God shall make manifest, who eventually appeared in the person of Baháʼu'lláh. Both the Báb and Baháʼu'lláh are revered as central figures of the Baháʼí Faith. A parallel is made between Baháʼu'lláh and the Báb as between Jesus and John the Baptist.

Impact
Abdu'l Baha summarises the Báb's impact: "Alone, He undertook a task that can scarcely be conceived... This illustrious Being arose with such power as to shake the foundations of the religious laws, customs, manners, morals, and habits of Persia, and instituted a new law, faith, and rel igion." He has been to compared to Martin Luther

The Bábí movement had a major impact on religious and social thought in 19th century Iran. Christopher de Bellaigue, writing about the Enlightenment period in the Islamic world, wrote,

Writings

The Báb affirms that the verses revealed by a Manifestation of God are the greatest proof of His mission and the writings of the Báb comprise over two thousand tablets, epistles, prayers, and philosophical treatises. These writings form part of Baha'i scripture, particularly his prayers, which are often recited individually as well as in devotional gatherings. The works of the Báb have also excited scholarly interest and analysis. Elham Afnan describes the writings of the Báb as having "restructured the thoughts of their readers, so that they could break free from the chains of obsolete beliefs and inherited customs". Jack McLean notes the novel symbolism of the Báb's works, observing that "The universe of the Báb's sacred writings is pervasively symbolic. Numbers, colors, minerals, liquids, the human body, social relationships, gestures, deeds, language (letters and words), and nature itself are all mirrors or signs that reflect the profounder reality of the names and attributes (asmá va sifát) of God". The Báb's works are characterised by linguistic innovation, including many neologisms whenever He found existing theological terms inadequate. Free association and stream-of-consciousness-style composition are marked features of some works. Several scholars have identified the continual repetition of particular words or phrases of religious importance to be a distinct feature throughout the Bab's writings. The Báb himself categorised his writings into five modes: divine verses, prayers, commentaries, rational discourse — written in Arabic — and the Persian mode, which encompasses the previous four. Scholars have noted commonalities between the Báb's writings and those of Western philosophers such as Hegel, Kant) and James Joyce

Most of the writings of the Báb have been lost, however. The Báb himself stated they exceeded five hundred thousand verses in length; the Quran, in contrast, is 6300 verses in length. If one assumes 25 verses per page, that would equal 20,000 pages of text. Nabíl-i-Zarandí, in The Dawn-breakers, mentions nine complete commentaries on the Quran, revealed during the Báb's imprisonment at Maku, which have been lost without a trace. Establishing the true text of the works that are still extant, as already noted, is not always easy, and some texts will require considerable work. Others, however, are in good shape; several of the Báb's major works are available in the handwriting of his trusted secretaries.

Most works were revealed in response to specific questions by Bábís. This is not unusual; the genre of the letter has been a venerable medium for composing authoritative texts as far back as Paul the Apostle. Three quarters of the chapters of the New Testament are letters, were composed to imitate letters, or contain letters within them. Sometimes the Báb revealed works very rapidly by chanting them in the presence of a secretary and eyewitnesses.

The Archives Department at the Baháʼí World Centre currently holds about 190 Tablets of the Báb. Excerpts from several principal works have been published in the only English-language compilation of the Báb's writings: Selections from the Writings of the Báb. Denis MacEoin, in his Sources for Early Bābī Doctrine and History, gives a description of many works; much of the following summary is derived from that source. In addition to major works, the Báb revealed numerous letters to his wife and followers, many prayers for various purposes, numerous commentaries on verses or chapters of the Quran, and many khutbihs or sermons (most of which were never delivered). Many of these have been lost; others have survived in compilations.

The Báb has been criticized for his inconsistent use of correct and incorrect Arabic grammar in his religious works, though in his Arabic letters he made very few mistakes. A reason for this inconsistency could be to distinguish those who could not see past the outer form of the words from those that could understand the deeper meaning of his message. The Báb in his Treatise on Grammar, emphasised that Arabic grammar must be taught as an outer symbol of the spiritual grammar of the universe.

Writings before his declaration

The Báb's Tafsir on Surah al-Baqara was started by the Báb in November or December 1843, some six months before declaring his mission. The first half was completed by February or March 1844; the second half was revealed after the Báb's declaration. It is the only work of the Báb's revealed before his declaration that has survived intact. It also sheds light on the Báb's attitude toward Twelver beliefs. His wife also refers to important episodes before his declaration.

Shiraz, May – September 1844
 The first chapter of the Qayyúmu'l-Asmáʼ ("Tafsir on the Surah Yusuf") was written by the Báb on the evening of 22 May 1844 when he made his declaration to Mullá Husayn. The entire work, which is several hundred pages in length and is considered to be revelation by Baháʼís, required forty days to write; it is one of the Báb's longer Arabic works. It was widely distributed in the first year of the Bábí movement, functioning as something of a Quran or Bible for the Bábís. In the book the Báb states his claim to be a Manifestation of God, though the claim is disguised with other statements that he is the servant of the Hidden Imám. Táhirih translated the work into Persian.
 Sahífih-yi-makhzúnih, revealed before his departure for Mecca in September 1844, and consists of a collection of fourteen prayers, mostly to be recited on specific holy days and festivals. Its content remained within the expectations of Islam.

Pilgrimage, September 1844 – June 1845
During his -month pilgrimage to Mecca, the Báb composed many works:
 Khasá'il-i-sabʿih: A work composed by the Báb on his sea journey back to Bushehr after his pilgrimage, which listed some regulations to be followed by the Bábí community. A copy of the manuscript probably still exists in Iran.
 Kitáb-i-Rúḥ ("Book of the Spirit"): This book contains 700 or 900 verses and was written while the Báb was sailing back to Bushehr from pilgrimage. The original was nearly destroyed when the Báb was arrested. Several manuscript copies are extant.
 Sahífih baynu'l-haramayn ("Treatise Between the Two Sanctuaries"): This Arabic work was written while the Báb traveled from Mecca to Medina in early 1845 and is in response to questions posed to him by a prominent Shaykhí leader.
 Kitáb-i-Fihrist ("The Book of the Catalogue"): A list of the Báb's works, composed by the Báb himself after he returned from pilgrimage to Mecca, 21 June 1845. It is a bibliography of his earliest writings.

Bushehr and Shiraz, March 1845 – September 1846
The Báb was in Bushehr March through June 1845, then in Shiraz.

 Sahífih-yi-Jaʿfariyyih: The Báb wrote this treatise to an unknown correspondent in 1845. Over a hundred pages in length, it states many of his basic teachings, especially in relation to some Shaykhi beliefs.
 Tafsír-i-Súrih-i-Kawthar ("Tafsir on the Surah al-Kawthar"): The Báb wrote this commentary for Yahyá Dárábí Vahíd while he was in Shiraz; it is the most important work revealed during the Shiraz period. Though the surah is only three verses in length, being the shortest in the Quran, the commentary on it is over two hundred pages in length. The work was widely distributed, and at least a dozen early manuscripts are extant.

Isfahan, September 1846 – March 1847
 Nubuvvih khásish: This work, of fifty pages' length, was revealed in two hours in response to a question by Governor Manouchehr Khan Gorji. It discusses the special prophethood of Muhammad, an important subject discussed in debates between Muslims and Christians.
 Tafsír-i-Súrih-i-va'l-ʿasr (Commentary on the Surah al-ʿAṣr): This is one of the two important works the Báb penned in Isfahan. It was written spontaneously and publicly in response to a request by Mir Sayyid Muhammad, the chief cleric of the city; much of it was written in one evening, to the astonishment to those present.

Maku, late summer 1847 – May 1848
The Báb left Isfahan in March 1847, sojourned outside Tehran several months, then was sent to a fortress at Maku, Iran, close to the Turkish border. It witnessed the composition of some of the Báb's most important works.

 Persian Bayán: This is undoubtedly the most important work of the Báb and contains a mature summary of his teachings. It was composed in Maku in late 1847 or early 1848. The work consists of nine chapters titled váhids or "unities", which in turn are usually subdivided into nineteen bábs or "gates"; the one exception is the last unity, which has only ten bábs. The Báb explained that it would be the task of "He Whom God shall make manifest" to complete the work; Baháʼís believe Baháʼu'lláh's Kitáb-i-Íqán to be the completion of the Bayán. Each unity begins with an Arabic summary of its contents, which makes it easier to read than many of the Báb's works. Extracts of this work are published in Selections from the Writings of the Báb; A. L. M. Nicolas translated the entire work into French in four 150-page volumes.
 Arabic Bayán: This is the shorter and less important of the two Bayáns. It consists of eleven váhids or "unities", each with nineteen bábs or "gates". It offers a succinct summary of the Báb's teachings and laws. It was composed at Maku in late 1847 or early 1848.
 Dalá'il-i-Sab'ih ("Seven Proofs"): There are two works by this name, the longer one in Persian, the shorter one in Arabic; both were composed in Maku in late 1847 or early 1848. Nicholas called the Persian Seven Proofs "the most important of the polemical works that issued from the pen of Sayyid ʿAlí Muhammad". The work was written to either a non-Bábí or to a follower whose faith had been shaken, but the recipient's identity is unknown. The Arabic text summarizes the seven proofs found in the Persian text.

C͟hihríq, May 1848 – July 1850
The Báb spent two years in Chehriq, except for his brief visit to Tabriz for his trial. The works he produced there were more esoteric or mystical and less thematically organized. Two major books were produced, in addition to many minor works:
 Kitabu'l-Asmáʼ ("The Book of Names"): This is an extremely long book about the names of God. It was penned during the Báb's last days at Chehriq, before his execution. The various manuscript copies contain numerous variations in the text; the book will require considerable work to reconstruct its original text.
 Kitáb-i-panj sha'n ("Book of Five Grades"): Having been composed in March and April 1850, this is one of the Báb's last works. The book consists of eighty-five sections arranged in seventeen groups, each under the heading of a different name of God. Within each group are five "grades", that is, five different sorts of sections: verses, prayers, homilies, commentaries, and Persian language pieces. Each group was sent to a different person and was composed on a different day. Thus the work is a kind of miscellany of unrelated material. Some of the sections represent further exposition of basic themes in the Báb's teachings; others consists of lengthy iterations of the names of God, and variations on their roots.

See also
 List of Mahdi claimants
 List of founders of religious traditions
 Twin Holy Birthdays

Notes

Citations

References

Baháʼí source material

Encyclopedias

Other resources

Further reading

External links

 Images of archival materials related to the Báb
 
 
 Writings of the Báb at Baháʼí Reference Library

1819 births
1850 deaths
19th-century Iranian writers
Bábism
Bahá'í central figures
Bahá'í martyrs
Burials at Monument Gardens, Haifa
Founders of new religious movements
Hashemite people
Iranian prophets
Iranian religious leaders
People executed for apostasy from Islam
People of Qajar Iran
People executed by Qajar Iran